Baker's small-toothed harvest mouse (Reithrodontomys bakeri) is a species of rodent in the family Cricetidae. It is one of about 20 species of the genus Reithrodontomys. This species was discovered in 2004
and is found in Central Mexico.

References

External links
 BYU.edu  (Viewed August 12, 2010).

Reithrodontomys
Mammals described in 2004